The Arctic Home in the Vedas is a 1903 pseudohistorical book on the origin of the Indo-Aryan peoples by Indian nationalist, teacher and independence activist Bal Gangadhar Tilak. Based on his analysis of Vedic hymns, Avestic passages, Vedic chronology and Vedic calendars, Tilak argued that the North Pole was the original home of Aryans during the pre-glacial period, which they left due to climate changes around 8000 B.C., migrating to the Northern parts of Europe and Asia.

Publication
The book was written at the end of 1898, but was first published in March 1903 in Pune. Tilak cited a book by first Boston University president  William F. Warren, Paradise Found or the Cradle of the Human Race at the North Pole, as having anticipated his ideas.

Tilak's Arctic homeland hypothesis

According to Tilak, writing at the end of the 19th century, the Neolithic Aryan race in Europe cannot be regarded as autochthonous, nor did the European Aryans descend from the Paleolithic man. Hence, the question of the original Aryan home is regarded as unsettled by Tilak.

According to Tilak, the close of the Pliocene and the whole of the Pleistocene period were marked by violent changes of climate bringing on what is called the Glacial and Inter-Glacial epochs:
 In the early geological ages, the Alps were low, the Himalayas not yet upheaved, Asia and Africa were represented only by a group of islands and an equable and uniform climate prevailed over the whole surface of the globe.
 A succession of cold and warm climates must have characterized these Glacial and Inter-Glacial periods which were also accompanied by extensive movements of depression and elevation of land, the depression taking place after the land was weighed down with the enormous mass of ice.
 Thus a period of glaciations was marked by elevation, extreme cold and the invasion of the ice-caps over regions of the present Temperate zone; while an inter-glacial period was accompanied by depression of land and milder and congenial climate which made even the Arctic regions habitable.
 The geographical distribution of land and water on the earth during the Inter-Glacial period was quite different from what it is at present.

The Arctic was inhabited by the Aryans. The ending of the Glacial age changed the climate there, and set the Aryan people on a migration to new habitats:
 A warm climate prevailed in the Arctic region. It was the coming on of the last Glacial age that destroyed this genial climate and rendered the regions unsuited for the habitation of tropical plants and animals.
 The Post-Glacial commenced at about 10,000 years ago or 8,000 BC. The surviving Aryans left the Arctic, searching for new lands to settle.

Characteristics of an Arctic home, characterised by a climate different from today's, are clearly recorded in several Vedic hymns and Avestic passages. There are descriptions of the prevailing conditions and of the day-to-day experience, but also recordings of stories told by the earlier generation, sometimes presented as myths. Tilak gives the following chronology of the post-glacial period:
 10,000 to 8000 BC – The destruction of the original Arctic home by the last ice age and the commencement of the post-Glacial period.
 8000 to 5000 BC – The age of migration from the original home. The survivors of the Aryan race roamed over the northern parts of Europe and Asia in search of lands suitable for new settlements. Tilak calls it the Pre-Orion Period.
 5000 to 3000 BC. –  The Orion period, when the vernal equinox was in Orion. Many Vedic hymns can be traced to the early part of this period and the bards of the race seem to have not yet forgotten the real importance of the traditions of the Arctic home inherited by them. It was at this time that first attempts to reform the calendar and the sacrificial system appear to have been systematically made.
 3000 to 1400 BC – The Krittika period, when the vernal equinox was in Pleiades. The traditions about the original Arctic home had grown dim by this time and were often misunderstood, making the Vedic hymns less and less intelligible.
 1400 to 500 BC – The Pre-Buddhistic period, when the Sutras and the Philosophical systems made their appearance.

Influence
M. S. Golwalkar, in his 1939 publication We or Our Nationhood Defined, famously stated that "Undoubtedly [...] we — Hindus — have been in undisputed and undisturbed possession of this land for over eight or even ten thousand years before the land was invaded by any foreign race." Golwalkar was inspired by Tilak's The Arctic Home in the Vedas. Gowalkar took over the idea of 10,000 years, arguing that the North Pole at that time was located in India.

Tilak's ideas influenced Soviet Indologist Natalia R. Guseva and Soviet ethnographer S.V Zharnikova, who argued for a northern Urals Arctic homeland of the Indo-Aryan and Slavic people; their ideas were popularized by Russian nationalists.

Robin Waterfield asserts that the book was influential on the esotericism of the Italian fascist Julius Evola.

See also

 Ancient North Eurasians
 Arctic
 Ariana
 Aryan
 Aryan race
 Aryavarta
 Atlantis
 Indo-Aryan languages
 Indo-Aryan peoples
 Indo-Aryans
 Indo-Iranians
 Indo-Iranian languages
 Kumari Kandam
 Kurgan
 Lemuria (continent)
 Mu (lost continent)
 Hyperborea
 Rigveda
 The Orion (book)
 Vedic Age

Notes

References

Sources

External links 
 
The Arctic Home in the Vedas  by B.G. Tilak, edition 1925.
The Whalers Atlas (Атлас Китобоев) by Dionysius Artifex 2021

Indus Valley civilisation
Vedic period
Indian non-fiction books
History books about the ancient era
History books about India
1903 non-fiction books
Bal Gangadhar Tilak
20th-century Indian books
Pseudohistory